Monique Covét (born Mónika Visi, on 14 July 1976) is a Hungarian pornographic actress and fetish model. She rose to prominence from 1998 to 2001 as the star of several features for the Private Media Group. Following her career as an international porn star she moved to Rome and studied fashion. In 2015 she was awarded a Diploma in Fashion and Design from Accademia del Lusso, Roma. In 2019, she received a diploma as a sex therapist from Semmelweis UniversityTraining Centre, Budapest. Also in 2019, she launched online advice on sexuality and personal relationships. She is fluent in English, German, Italian and Hungarian.

Early career 
By her own account, Monique Covét started her career in the world of hardcore porn almost by accident. After arriving in Paris for what she believed was another series of routine modeling shoots, her agent there recommended her for a Private Media casting session where she met French hardcore director and actor Pierre Woodman. "They offered me a lead role right away as they said I had star quality", she said. "I am the kind of person who tries everything once. Everyone was so kind to me. I thought that if this is the situation, why not try it?". In 2015, Covét was described in the film Best of Private 50th Anniversary as "one of the five most legendary and formative porn actresses of the past 50 years".

Personal life 
Details of her life and career are featured in the book Hungarian Female Adult Models.

Awards
 1998 Private Girl of the Year Award
 2000 Venus Award Best Actress Eastern Europe
 2001 Venus Award Winner Best Actress Europe
 2001 Zeus Award in Switzerland
 2002 Sexhajón dij 
 2004 Brussels Erotic Film Festival European X Awards - Lifetime Achievement Award
 2004 Sexiest Porn Actress 
 2005 Magyar Porn Oscar  Best Actress
 2005 and 2006 Lifetime Achievement Awards 
 2006 Hardest sex award

References

External links

 
 
 
 
 
 
 

1976 births
Hungarian female adult models
Hungarian pornographic film actresses
Living people
Actresses from Budapest
Models from Budapest